Teerapong Deehamhae is a Thai professional footballer who plays as a defensive midfielder for Thai League 3 club Mahasarakham.

Honours

Club
Roi Et United
 Regional League Division 2 Champions (1) : 2013
 Regional League North-East Division Champions (3) : 2011, 2012, 2013

External links
 Siamsport
https://th.soccerway.com/players/teerapong-deehamhae/348637/

1991 births
Living people
Teerapong Deehamhae
Teerapong Deehamhae
Association football midfielders
Teerapong Deehamhae
Teerapong Deehamhae
Teerapong Deehamhae
Teerapong Deehamhae